Dobryn is a rural locality (a village) in Klimovsky District, Bryansk Oblast, Russia. The population was 2 as of 2010.

Geography 
Dobryn is located 14 km southwest of Klimovo (the district's administrative centre) by road. Gukov is the nearest rural locality.

References 

Rural localities in Klimovsky District